Crocus was Ptolemaic governor of Cyprus and admiral of the Ptolemaic navy in the second century BC.

Crocus is mentioned as governor (strategos) of Cyprus and admiral (nauarchos) in three inscriptions dated between 131 and 124 BC. His predecessor in this role was Seleucus, son of Bithys. During Crocus' tenure as governor there was a civil war between Cleopatra II and Ptolemy VIII, who made Cyprus his power-base. In one inscription, Crocus' title is given as strategos autokrator, which indicates that he held unlimited authority, analogous to a viceroy. Ptolemy VIII probably gave him this extra power so that he could concentrate on fighting the civil war.

After the end of the civil war, Crocus is attested in one more inscription, no longer in the role of governor, but as a close associate of the king (hypermachos), whom he probably accompanied back to Alexandria. His successor in Cyprus was Theodorus, the son of his predecessor.

References

Bibliography 
 Roger S. Bagnall: The Administration of the Ptolemaic possessions outside Egypt. (1976), p. 259.
 Wilhelm Dittenberger: Orientis Graeci inscriptiones selectae, Vol. 1 (1903), No. 140, p. 221.
 T. B. Mitford: "Seleucus and Theodorus," Opuscula Atheniensia, Vol. 1 (1953), pp. 130–171.
 T. B. Mitford: "The Hellenistic Inscriptions of Old Paphos," The Annual of the British School at Athens, Vol. 56 (1961), p. 28.

2nd-century BC births
2nd-century BC deaths
2nd-century BC Greek people
Ptolemaic admirals
Ptolemaic governors of Cyprus